Governor Ellis may refer to:

F. R. Ellis (1849–1915), 8th Governor of North Borneo from 1911 to 1912
Henry Ellis (governor) (1721–1806), 6th Colonial Governor of Georgia from 1758 to 1760 and Governor of Nova Scotia from 1760 to 1763
Thomas Hobart Ellis (1894–1981), Governor of East Pakistan from 1954 to 1954